Ernst Winter (30 October 1907 – 1943) was a German artistic gymnast. He represented Eintracht Frankfurt gymnastics club.

He competed in one Olympic Games and one World Championships for Germany. He competed in the 1936 Summer Olympics, where Germany won a team gold. He did not win any individual medals, and his 17th in the pommel horse and 19th on the free exercise were his best results. He came 58th overall.

Winter won two medals at the 1934 World Championships, bronze in the team competition and gold in the parallel bars.

At the national level, he finished second five times at the German Championships from 1931 to 1935.

He died in a prison of war camp during World War II.

See also
 Gymnastics at the 1936 Summer Olympics

References

External links
 

German male artistic gymnasts
Olympic gymnasts of Germany
Olympic gold medalists for Germany
Gymnasts at the 1936 Summer Olympics
1907 births
1943 deaths
Olympic medalists in gymnastics
Medalists at the 1936 Summer Olympics
German military personnel killed in World War II
20th-century German people